Cambodia does not recognize same-sex marriage or civil unions, but does recognize a registry program known as "declaration of family relationship", offering limited legal rights. As of June 2021, the registry has been introduced in 68 communes. Same-sex marriage has received support from King Norodom Sihamoni and his late father, King Norodom Sihanouk.

The Constitution of Cambodia defines marriage as the union of "one husband and one wife".

Partnerships
The Rainbow Community Kampuchea (RoCK) with the help of local authorities has created a formal relationship registry program called the "Declaration of Family Relationship". According to RoCK, "the Declaration of Family Relationship is a civil contract between two people who are willing to be together and share responsibility taking care of the family, children and distribute the joint asset, as legal spouses do". It can serve as an evidence-based documentation of a relationship for a same-sex couple. By May 2018, the civil contract had been introduced to 50 communes in 15 provinces. As of June 2021, the program had been introduced to 68 communes in 20 provinces, and 26 couples had signed the forms.

Same-sex marriage

Legal situation

In September 1993, the Cambodia Constituent Assembly, a special body elected in 1993, drafted a constitution for Cambodia. This Constitution defines marriage as the union of "one husband and one wife". Article 45 of the Constitution reads:

Article 3 of the Law on the Marriage and Family, enacted on 17 July 1989, reads: "A marriage is a solemn contract between a man and a woman in a spirit of love in accordance with the provisions of law and with the understanding that they cannot dissolve it as they please". The Civil Code also implies a married couple to be "husband and wife".

Case of one marriage
There is one recorded case of a legally valid same-sex civil marriage contracted in Cambodia. Khav Sokha and Pum Eth were married on March 12, 1995 in the village of Kro Bao Ach Kok, Kandal, where they are from. Sokha said in an interview with The Phnom Penh Post, "The authorities thought it was strange, but they agreed to tolerate it because I have three children already (from a previous marriage). They said that if we were both single (and childless), we would not be allowed to get married because we could not produce children". Thus, it was a fully acknowledged marriage, with official approval, and there was not really any reaction to it. It was a popular event, with 250 people coming to the ceremony and partying, including Buddhist monks and high officials from the province.

In February 2018, a dual Cambodian-French same-sex couple attempted to marry in the town of Kratié. Police prevented the wedding ceremony from taking place and arrested the couple.

Legalization attempts
After witnessing same-sex marriages being performed in San Francisco in 2004, King Norodom Sihanouk expressed support for legalizing such unions in Cambodia. His son and successor, King Norodom Sihamoni, has also expressed support for same-sex marriage.

Following the enactment of the Constitution of Nepal in September 2015, several governmental organisations and spokespeople made positive comments on same-sex marriage and partnerships. The Minister of Interior, Sar Kheng, announced the possibility to push for the legalization of same-sex marriage. The Ministry of Women's Affairs incorporated same-sex couples in its second National Action Plan to Prevent Violence Against Women 2014-2018. Government spokesman Phay Siphan expressed support for the LGBT community and said "Cambodian society does not discriminate against LGBT people. It is only individuals who do so. No Cambodian laws discriminate against them, and nothing is banning them from loving each other or getting married". The Cambodian Government also expressed a welcome reaction to the Nepal Constitution, saying there was a possibility for same-sex marriages to be passed as a law.

In May 2017, the Cambodia National Rescue Party (CNRP) announced it would hold a referendum on the issue of same-sex marriage if elected. The Khmer National United Party (KNUP) said they would consider legalising same-sex marriage if they won the 2018 general election. Other parties that have announced their support of same-sex marriage include FUNCINPEC, the League for Democracy Party (LDP) and the Grassroots Democracy Party (GDP). However, with the absence of a credible opposition, the elections were viewed as a formality and dismissed as sham elections by the international community. They resulted in a widely expected landslide victory for the ruling Cambodian People's Party (CPP), which won all 125 seats in the National Assembly. The CPP has said it has no plans to legalise same-sex marriage, but is "open to considering it". In February 2019, Prime Minister Hun Sen said that the country is "not yet ready" to legalise same-sex marriage.

After the Taiwanese Constitutional Court ruled in May 2017 that banning same-sex marriage is unconstitutional in Taiwan, 43 civil society groups and trade unions called on the government to legalise same-sex marriage in Cambodia.

In 2019, the Cambodian Center for Human Rights released a report which showed that discrimination against same-sex partners had decreased in Cambodia, but they still lack major legal protections, namely same-sex marriage and adoption rights. The report stated that "80% percent of 'rainbow families' believe that discrimination would be reduced if they were legally permitted to marry their partner. Excluding LGBT people from the institution of marriage excludes them from one of the foundations of Cambodian society." In response, government spokesman Phay Siphan said that the government has supported same-sex partners and has facilitated couples with joint ownership of property. However, "amending the law must be line with Khmer traditions and customs", he said. On 30 January 2019, at the country's third Universal Periodic Review, Iceland, the Netherlands and Canada recommended Cambodia to legalize same-sex marriage. On 5 July 2019, the government accepted these recommendations. The government announced in January 2023 that it was reviewing the laws of countries where same-sex marriage is legal.

Statistics
According to a 2018 report by CamAsean Youth's Future, a group that works to promote LGBT rights, there were about 6,000 same-sex couples in Cambodia. 2019 government figures showed that they were about 33,000 LGBT people in Cambodia, including about 5,000 cohabiting couples.

Public opinion
In 2015, TNS Cambodia conducted a survey focused on attitudes towards LGBT people in Cambodia. The sample was 1,563 people from 10 different provinces. 1,085 identified as straight and 478 identified as LGBT. 60% lived in rural areas, 24% in urban areas and 16% in semi-urban Phnom Penh. Support for same-sex marriage was 38% among straight people, while 42% were opposed and 20% were neutral. Among LGBT people, 94% expressed support for same-sex marriage: from 96% among transgender women to 89% among gay men. 3% of LGBT people expressed opposition. In total, 55% of respondents were in favour of same-sex marriage, 30% were opposed and 15% were neutral. The most frequent reasons for approval were "human rights" and "it is in their [LGBT people] nature", whereas opponents cited "against Khmer values and traditions" and "against human nature" as their most frequent reasons for disapproval.

See also
LGBT rights in Cambodia
Recognition of same-sex unions in Asia

Notes

References

LGBT rights in Cambodia
Cambodia